Peter Gübeli (12 August 1925 – 2 December 2014) was a Swiss rower. He competed in the men's eight event at the 1948 Summer Olympics.

References

1925 births
2014 deaths
Swiss male rowers
Olympic rowers of Switzerland
Rowers at the 1948 Summer Olympics
Rowers from Zürich